The 1988 NCAA Division I Wrestling Championships were the 58th NCAA Division I Wrestling Championships to be held. The Iowa State University in Ames, Iowa hosted the tournament at Hilton Coliseum.

Arizona State took home the team championship with 93 points despite having no individual champions. 

Scott Turner of North Carolina State was named the Most Outstanding Wrestler and Eric Voelker of Iowa State received the Gorriaran Award.

Team results

Individual finals

References
1988 NCAA Tournament Results

NCAA Division I Wrestling Championship
NCAA
Wrestling competitions in the United States
NCAA Division I  Wrestling Championships
NCAA Division I  Wrestling Championships
NCAA Division I  Wrestling Championships